Grammistini is one of the five tribes in the subfamily Epinephelinae, the group including the groupers, which is part of the family Serranidae which also includes the anthias and the sea basses. They are found in tropical oceans around the world.

Genera
The following genera are included within the Grammistini:

 Aporops Schultz, 1943
 Grammistes Bloch & Schneider, 1801
 Grammistops Schultz 1953
 Jeboehlkia Robins, 1967
 Pogonoperca Günther, 1859
 Pseudogramma Bleeker, 1875
 Rypticus Cuvier, 1829
 Suttonia J.L.B. Smith, 1953

References

Epinephelinae
Fish tribes